Finnish national road 5 (Finnish:Valtatie 5 or Viitostie, Swedish: Riksväg 5) is a main route connecting Lusi (Heinola) in the south of the country to Sodankylä in the north. It is 905 kilometres long. National road 5 forms part of the E63 between Vehmasmäki (Kuopio) and Sodankylä.

The route

The road runs through the following municipalities: Heinola – Pertunmaa – Mäntyharju – Hirvensalmi – Mikkeli – Juva – Joroinen – Varkaus – Leppävirta – Kuopio – Siilinjärvi – Lapinlahti – Iisalmi – Sonkajärvi – Kajaani – Paltamo – Ristijärvi – Hyrynsalmi – Suomussalmi – Taivalkoski – Kuusamo – Posio – Salla – Kemijärvi – Pelkosenniemi – Sodankylä.

Trivia
 Kuortti's ABC filling station is the most popular in Finland in terms of sales; according to the cooperative, in 2017 more than three million customers visited it.
 The band Aavikko has written a song about National road 5 called "Viitostie".

References

External links

Roads in Finland